is a god kaiju who first appeared in Toho's 1974 Godzilla film Godzilla vs. Mechagodzilla. In his first film appearance, King Caesar is portrayed as a guardian deity and the protector of an ancient Ryukyuan family. Awakened from a dormant state, King Caesar joins forces with Godzilla to vanquish Mechagodzilla.

Overview

Name

King Caesar's name and appearance are based on Shisa, which are artistically embellished stone lion statues common in Okinawa, where the film Godzilla vs. Mechagodzilla took place. They are an Okinawan variation on the Chinese guardian lion (石獅; Shishi, meaning "Stone Lion"), which in turn originates from Buddhist tradition in India, where Asiatic lions are native. Shisa only loosely resemble actual lions on account of being based on second-hand descriptions by people who had never seen one in person. In the 1970s, general East Asian folklore were relatively unknown to Western audiences, which resulted in the translators interpreting name "Shisa" to be a Japanization of the name "Caesar". Toho has since trademarked it, making "King Caesar" the character's official English name.

Overview and development
King Caesar's character concept was inspired by a traditional Okinawan folk tale in which a Shisa protects a village from a rampaging dragon. This myth is referenced in the character's introductory film, Godzilla vs. Mechagodzilla, in which the titular Mechagodzilla plays the role of the evil "dragon". It is portrayed as a loyal and powerful protector of mankind, in reference to the role Shisa play in Okinawan tradition. King Caesar is shown to be swift and athletic. It can also draw an enemy's energy weapons into its right eye and reflect them back from its left eye with ten times the force, and empower itself with solar energy.

Powers and abilities
King Caesar is portrayed as an incredibly agile martial artist, possessing both speed and super-strength. He is also capable of absorbing energy beam attacks or energy projections and reflecting this energy back at his opponent through his eyes. In the television show Godzilla Island, King Caesar is depicted as being able to fire an electricity beam from his mouth.

Reception
Along with fellow 1970s Showa era monster Gigan, King Caesar is the favourite monster of director Ryuhei Kitamura, which led to the character's inclusion in the film Godzilla: Final Wars.

Appearances

Films
 Godzilla vs. Mechagodzilla (1974)
 Terror of Mechagodzilla (1975, very brief stock footage mistake)
 Godzilla: Final Wars (2004)

Television
 Godzilla Island (1997-1998)
 Godziban (2019, as Young Caesar)

Video games
 Battle Soccer: Field no Hasha (SNES - 1992)
 Kaijū-ō Godzilla / King of the Monsters, Godzilla (Game Boy - 1993)
 Godzilla Trading Battle (PlayStation - 1998)
 Godzilla: Unleashed (Wii - 2007)
 Godzilla Defense Force (2019)

Literature
 Godzilla: Rulers of Earth (comic - 2013–2015)
 Godzilla: Oblivion (comic - 2016)
 GODZILLA: Project Mechagodzilla (2018)

References

Fictional golems
Fictional gods
Godzilla characters
Mothra characters
Toho monsters
Fantasy film characters
Film characters introduced in 1974
Fictional characters with superhuman strength
Fictional monsters
Kaiju